Camberabero is a surname. Notable people with the surname include:

Didier Camberabero (born 1961), French rugby union player, son of Guy
Guy Camberabero (born 1936), French rugby union player
Lilian Camberabero (1937–2015), French rugby union player, brother of Guy